Siddhinath Mahavidyalaya, established in 2013,  is the government degree college in Purba Medinipur district. It offers undergraduate courses in arts. It is affiliated to Vidyasagar University.

Departments

Bengali
English
History
Philosophy
Sanskrit
Geography
Education

See also

References

External links
Siddhinath Mahavidyalaya

Colleges affiliated to Vidyasagar University
Educational institutions established in 2013
Universities and colleges in Purba Medinipur district
2013 establishments in West Bengal